Orion is a hamlet in Alberta, Canada within the County of Forty Mile No. 8.

Demographics 
Orion recorded a population of 11 in the 1991 Census of Population conducted by Statistics Canada.

Services 

The hamlet has a grocery store, a post office, a gas station/hardware store, a newly built church and many remaining facades of past businesses.  As of August 2020 there is no longer a gas station/hardware store.

See also 
List of communities in Alberta
List of hamlets in Alberta
List of ghost towns in Alberta

References 

County of Forty Mile No. 8
Ghost towns in Alberta
Hamlets in Alberta